International Center for Journalists (ICFJ) is a non-profit, professional organization located in Washington, D.C., United States, that promotes journalism worldwide.  Since 1984, the International Center for Journalists has worked directly with more than 70,000 journalists from 180 countries over 27 years. ICFJ offers hands-on training, workshops, seminars, fellowships and international exchanges to reporters and media managers around the globe.

History

ICFJ was founded in 1984 by Tom Winship, Jim Ewing, and George Krimsky, three prominent U.S. journalists, to support their fellow journalists abroad, especially those in countries with poor or non-existent free press systems. They believed that the proper role of the news media is to expose, investigate, and articulate issues of concern to average citizens and wished to propagate these ideals across the globe. 

In 2006, ICFJ established the ICFJ Founders Award for Excellence in Journalism as a tribute to Winship, Ewing and Krimsky. This award is presented to a journalist with a long-time commitment to the highest standards of the profession. Past recipients include CBS News' Bob Schieffer (2006), NBC News' Tom Brokaw (2007), The New York Times' John F. Burns (2008) and investigative journalist Seymour Hersh (2009).

Flagship Programs

Knight International Journalism Fellowships

The Knight International Journalism Fellowships program pairs global media professionals with partner media organizations in key countries where there are opportunities for meaningful and measurable change.  The program, launched in 1994 with support from the John S. and James L. Knight Foundation, now also receives support from the Bill & Melinda Gates Foundation.

International Journalists’ Network (IJNet)

The International Journalists’ Network (IJNet) is an online service that provides information on a wide range of training opportunities to a global network of journalists and media development organizations. The site offers the latest social networking tools, discussion spaces and forums. IJNet also sends weekly email bulletins in Arabic, English, Chinese, Persian, Portuguese, Russian and Spanish to more than 71,000 media professionals.

IJNet keeps track of media training and other assistance efforts in more than 150 countries, enabling donors and journalism training organizations to maximize resources and avoid duplication.  Support for IJNet comes from the Eurasia Foundation, the John S. and James L. Knight Foundation, the National Endowment for Democracy, the Open Society Institute and friends of ICFJ.

References

External links

International Center for Journalists 
ICFJ/Knight International Journalism Fellowships 
International Journalists’ Network (IJNet)

International journalism organizations